Sharlow may refer to:

People
Karen Sharlow
Myrna Sharlow

Other
Sharlow, West Virginia, an unincorporated community and coal town in Boone County